Mount Weart is a  triple-summit mountain located in the Garibaldi Ranges of the Coast Mountains, in northwestern Garibaldi Provincial Park of southwestern British Columbia, Canada. The Armchair Glacier rests below the west aspect of the summit, and the massive Weart Glacier spans the northern and eastern aspects of the mountain. Precipitation runoff from the peak and meltwater from the glaciers drains into Wedgemount Lake and tributaries of the Lillooet River.

History
Originally known by the mountaineering community as Armchair Mountain or The Armchair, the Garibaldi Park Board submitted the name "Mount Weart" in 1928, after their board's chairman at the time, John Walter Weart (1861-1941). The mountain's name was officially adopted on September 2, 1930, by the Geographical Names Board of Canada. The first ascent of the mountain was made in 1932 by B. Cook and P. Tait.

Climate

Based on the Köppen climate classification, Mount Weart is located in the marine west coast climate zone of western North America. Most weather fronts originate in the Pacific Ocean, and travel east toward the Coast Mountains where they are forced upward by the range (Orographic lift), causing them to drop their moisture in the form of rain or snowfall. As a result, the Coast Mountains experience high precipitation, especially during the winter months in the form of snowfall. Winter temperatures can drop below −20 °C with wind chill factors below −30 °C. The months July through September offer the most favorable weather for climbing Weart.

Climbing Routes

Established rock climbing routes on Mount Weart:

 Southeast Ridge -  
 Southwest Ridge -   
 Northwest Ridge -  
 North Face - steep ice

See also

 Geography of British Columbia
 Geology of British Columbia

References

External links
 Weather: Mountain Forecast
 Climbing Mt. Weart: YouTube

Garibaldi Ranges
Two-thousanders of British Columbia
Sea-to-Sky Corridor
New Westminster Land District